Amber Belair is a community in Saint George Parish, Grenada.  It is located at the southern end of the island.

Populated places in Grenada